Philip of Burgundy may refer to:

Philip of Burgundy, Count of Auvergne (1323–1346), count-consort of Auvergne and Boulogne, son of Eudes IV, Duke of Burgundy and Princess Jeanne of France
Philip I, Duke of Burgundy (1346–1361), also called Philip of Rouvres
Philip II, Duke of Burgundy, the Bold, (1342–1404), son of King John II of France
Philip the Good, duke of Burgundy, (1396–1467), son of John the Fearless
Philip I of Castile (1478–1506), who was also known as Philip IV, Duke of Burgundy
Philip of Burgundy (bishop) (1464–1524), illegitimate son of Philip the Good, bishop of Utrecht